Stacey Ruth Castor (née Daniels, formerly Wallace; July 24, 1967 – June 11, 2016) was an American convicted murderer from Weedsport, New York. In 2009, she was found guilty of intentionally poisoning her then-husband David Castor with antifreeze in 2005 and attempting to murder her daughter, Ashley Wallace, with crushed pills mixed in with vodka, orange juice, and Sprite in 2007. In addition, she is suspected of having murdered her first husband, Michael Wallace, in 2000; his grave lay next to David Castor's until David's remains were disinterred in 2016 and buried elsewhere by his son. The story made national news, and Castor was subsequently named "The Black Widow" by media outlets. A special two-hour edition of ABC's 20/20 aired on April 24, 2009, and again on February 8, 2019, to provide the full story of the Castor case.

Early life
Stacey, the daughter of Jerry Daniels and Judie Eaton, met Michael Wallace when she was 17, in 1985, and they bonded immediately. The couple married and had their first daughter, Ashley, in 1988. In 1991, they had a second daughter, Bree.

Castor was employed by an ambulance dispatch company, while Wallace worked nights as a mechanic, but the family had little money. According to Castor, Wallace was very close to Bree, showing a favoritism that Castor made up for by becoming "best friends" with elder daughter Ashley. Despite their closeness with their children, the couple grew apart, and it was rumored that each was having affairs.

Murders
In late 1999, Wallace began feeling intermittently ill. Family members variously remember him as acting unsteady, coughing and seeming swollen. As his inexplicable sickness persisted over the holiday season, his family encouraged him to seek medical care, but he died in early 2000 before he could do so. Their daughter Ashley was 12 at the time and had been alone with him. She had noticed his ill appearance that day, but thought nothing of it. Physicians told Castor that her husband had died of a heart attack. Although Wallace's sister was skeptical and requested an autopsy for Wallace, Castor refused, saying she believed the doctors were correct.

In 2003, Stacey married David Castor, whose surname she used from that point forward.  Castor was the owner of an air conditioning installation and repair company, and Stacey served as his office manager. In August 2005, at 2:00 one afternoon, Castor called her local sheriff's office to tell them that her husband had locked himself in their bedroom for a day following an argument and was not responding to his cell phone. When he did not appear at their shared workplace, she had become worried. She claimed he was depressed. Unable to get a response, Sergeant Robert Willoughby of the Onondaga County Sheriff's Department kicked in the door of the bedroom and found David Castor lying dead. Among the items near his body were a container of antifreeze and a half-full glass of bright green liquid. Willoughby says he remembers that Castor screamed, "He's not dead, he's not dead."

The coroner reported that David Castor had committed suicide through a self-administered lethal dose of antifreeze, but when police found Stacey Castor's fingerprints on the antifreeze glass and located a turkey baster that had David Castor's DNA on the tip, they began to suspect Stacey Castor had engineered her husband's death. They believed Castor had used the turkey baster to force-feed him once he became too physically weak.

The detectives on the case ordered wiretappings on Castor's house. They listened in on phone calls for any unusual conversations. In addition, they set up cameras overlooking Castor's house and the gravesites of her husbands, who had been buried side by side at Castor's request. Detectives reasoned that if Castor were truly genuine about her love for her late husbands, then she would eventually visit their graves. They wanted to observe her behavior while there. Castor, however, never visited. The investigators soon felt the only way to prove Castor responsible for both homicides was to have Wallace's body exhumed. A toxicology screening ruled that Wallace had also been killed through antifreeze poisoning.

Attempted murder
In September 2007, amid mounting evidence that Castor had murdered both of her husbands, she began to panic. After she learned police had exhumed Wallace's body and found traces of antifreeze in his system, she was believed to have devised a plan to set up her daughter Ashley for the murders.

On Ashley's first day of college, investigators came to her school to question her about her father's death and to inform her that he had been poisoned instead of having died of a heart attack. An upset Ashley called Castor. Soon after, Ashley said, Castor invited her to come to the family home in Liverpool and drink together. Castor said that they had been through enough emotional stress and needed to relax. Ashley agreed because Castor was not only her mother but her "best friend".

The following day, Castor invited Ashley to drink together at home again. She says that her mother offered her a "nasty-tasting" drink that she at first refused but eventually drank because she trusted Castor. Seventeen hours later, Ashley was found comatose on her bed by her younger sister Bree Wallace. Bree demanded that help be sought, and Castor made the 911 call. Ashley's sister left her side for a moment and when she returned, she found a suicide note beside Ashley. The note appeared to be Ashley's "murder confession", in which she "admits" to having killed her father and stepfather. Castor quickly took the note from the sister and later gave it to the paramedics. Tests revealed that potentially fatal painkillers had been found in Ashley's system, and that she most likely would have died if taking her to the hospital had been just a few minutes later. When Ashley woke up, with police questioning her about the murders and the suicide note found beside her, she said that the last thing she remembered was her mother making her an alcoholic drink, something she had never done before. She told the officers that she did not write the note and was confused about their questions and accusations.

Arrest and trial
For two years, investigators had collected evidence against Castor for the deaths of her husbands. In 2007, she was arrested for second degree murder in David's death and for attempting to murder Ashley and frame her for the murders of David and Wallace.

Prosecutors argued that the computer-generated note where Ashley "confesses" to killing Wallace and David had actually been written by Castor. Ashley was 12 at the time of her father Wallace's death. When brought on the stand, she testified that she did not murder either her father or her stepfather nor did she write the suicide note.

Onondaga County District Attorney William Fitzpatrick and Chief Assistant District Attorney Christine Garvey argued that David Castor's "suicide" had never made sense given the lack of his fingerprints on the glass or container tainted with ethylene glycol, a toxic substance found in antifreeze, and the turkey baster found in the kitchen garbage bearing both ethylene glycol and his DNA. They felt that this suggested he was force-fed antifreeze. Given evidence of the evolution of David Castor's illness, they concluded that Castor had for four days fed her husband antifreeze through the baster before trying to make it look like a suicide. She had said that her husband got the idea to kill himself with antifreeze while both were watching a news report about Lynn Turner, who murdered two past lovers by using the poison.

The prosecutors presented evidence showing how antifreeze poisoning can be identified from the growth of calcium oxalate crystals in the kidneys, and that this was seen with examination of Wallace and David's bodies as well. In addition, they noted money as one of the main reasons Castor murdered her husbands. She had murdered her husbands partly to collect on their life insurance and estates, and had changed David's will to exclude his son by a previous marriage from the money left to him by David.

"In 2005, people started to put it together," Cayuga County Sheriff Dave Gould said. "If Mr. Wallace had been cremated, or if Mr. Castor had not died, we would never have known we had a homicide."

Having searched Castor's computer, prosecutors had found several drafts of the suicide note Ashley was accused of writing. Forensic investigators found that based on the timestamps, it had been written while Ashley was in school, proving she couldn't have been its author. They argued that the "suicide attempt" had actually been a planned-out murder attempt by Castor against Ashley. On the stand, Ashley retold how her mother had convinced her to drink the two nights before she almost died. She repeated that she only drank the "nasty-tasting" beverage because she trusted Castor. She maintained her innocence of the two murders and the writing of the note.

Castor's defense team—attorneys Charles Keller and Todd Smith—was set on creating reasonable doubt in the jury's minds about Castor having committed the murders. They wanted to "poke holes" in Ashley's version of what happened and prove that she could have been capable of murder at age 11. They noted Ashley's father, Wallace, showing favoritism toward his younger daughter rather than Ashley and cited jealousy as a possible motive for Ashley having murdered at such a young age. For her stepfather, they noted his and Ashley's tumultuous relationship and how they did not get along with each other. Castor's mother believed her granddaughter Ashley to be guilty. In a final attempt to convince the jury that she was not guilty, Castor took the stand.

On cross examination, Fitzpatrick pointed out what he felt were flaws in Castor's version of that night. She maintained that it was Ashley who murdered Wallace and David, though she would not speculate about motives beyond implying that her daughter might be mentally ill. Fitzpatrick pointed out that Ashley's mother had never sought therapy for her and that at 21 Ashley exhibited no sign of mental illness.

Fitzpatrick asserted that Castor's behavior during David Castor's and Ashley's illnesses made no sense, given the years she had worked for a paramedics company. She did not seek care for Ashley for 17 hours and indicated that David Castor, who was staggering and vomiting and unable to stand, "looked OK". Likewise, he questioned how a woman who had lost two husbands to poisoning would not seek help for a daughter in Ashley's state. Fitzpatrick frequently shouted at Castor, inspiring Castor's defense attorney Charles Keller to frequently object and even to request a mistrial.

Prosecutors brought up another piece of "damaging evidence" against Castor when they cited having heard "typing sounds" while Castor was on the phone. During one of the wiretapped recordings presented, "typing sounds" can be heard while Castor talks to a friend, though Castor denied memory of using the computer that day. Prosecutors argued the "typing sounds" were those of one of the several drafts Castor had written of the suicide note. Ashley had already testified to having witnessed her mother working on the computer on something she had hidden to prevent Ashley's seeing it. Fitzpatrick claimed this was the day Castor wrote the note, which had Castor's fingerprints but not Ashley's, to frame her daughter. He told the jury about the word antifreeze being written as "anti-free" in four places within the note and noted that Castor had also said "anti-free" during an interview. Castor said she had cut herself off while saying "antifreeze" because she had intended to say something else.

Castor's defense team presented a pharmaceutical expert in an attempt to cast doubt on the prosecution's claim that Castor had drugged Ashley 17 hours prior to being taken to the hospital. "Professor Francis Gengo testified that after analyzing the traces of drugs and alcohol found in blood drawn from Ashley at the hospital, Ashley would have had to ingest the alcohol, Ritalin, and several other drugs just several hours before she was hospitalized."

On February 5, 2009, Castor was found guilty of second degree murder in the poisoning death of David and of attempted second degree murder for overdosing her daughter Ashley with drugs and vodka. With a "jam-packed" courtroom, most were focused on Castor. She, however, had her eyes closed as the verdicts were read. Her lead defense counsel, Keller, announced that Castor would appeal the verdict, including challenging the inclusion of evidence regarding the death of her first husband, for which Castor had not been charged.

On March 5, 2009, at Castor's sentencing, Chief Assistant District Attorney Christine Garvey asked Fahey to impose the maximum consecutive sentences because of the brutality of David's death. Further, she criticized how Castor had "partied in her backyard with friends like nothing was happening" as Ashley was comatose in her room. "She is cold, calculating and without any emotion for what she has done," she stated. "Human life is sacred. Stacey Castor places no value on human life, not even her own flesh and blood. To Stacey Castor, human beings are disposable."

David's son, whom Castor had cheated out of his inheritance, pleaded with Judge Fahey for Castor to be severely punished. "Your honor, [Castor] is a monster and a threat to society," he said. "She has created so much pain and death with this, creating multiples of pain and death, in the families of those she has hurt."

Judge Fahey told Castor that he had never seen a parent attempt to murder their child in order to set their child up for a crime they themselves committed and declared Castor "in a class all by [her]self". He sentenced her to the maximum of 25 years to life for the murder of David Castor, and to another 25 years for the attempt to kill Ashley. For forging David's will, he ordered Castor to serve an additional 1 to four years in prison.

The trial had lasted for four weeks. An emotional Ashley told the judge she hated her mother "for ruining so many people's lives" but still loved her for the bond she originally had with her.

Fitzpatrick said that under New York sentencing guidelines, Castor would have to serve just over 51 years before she became eligible for parole—at her age, effectively a life sentence.

Aftermath
Castor, New York Department of Corrections inmate number 09G0209, was placed in Bedford Hills Correctional Facility for Women in Bedford Hills, New York.  Even with credit for time served, her earliest possible release date was June 15, 2055—slightly over a month shy of her 88th birthday.

On April 24, 2009, ABC aired a two-hour 20/20 special about Castor and the trial, which included interviews. During the trial, Castor had been dubbed "The Black Widow" by media outlets, a title previously given to Lynn Turner. Ashley said that she does not know how her mother, any mother, could try to kill her own child, a question that the public has also pondered. Castor, who professed to being shocked at the guilty verdict, maintained her innocence during the on-air 20/20 special, as well as in unaired parts of the program. She said that "Ashley brought this on" and insists that she and Ashley know what really happened. She did express sympathy for her daughter Bree. She called Bree an innocent victim, whom she lost along with her freedom and her husbands. She indicated that her mother, stepfather and some other relatives still support her.

Bree, like Ashley, never spoke to Castor after the trial. Bree said that though losing her mother was hard, "I was happy that they said she was guilty, because we all know that she's guilty." Ashley said, "I would have done anything for her. But she tried to kill me instead." Both of Castor's daughters expressed concern that their mother had not yet apologized to them. Castor maintains she is innocent of the deaths of her husbands and the attempted murder of Ashley.

ABC interviewed forensic psychiatrist Dr. James Knoll for psychological perspective on the case and he answered viewers' questions via video on April 23, 2009, and via site comments on April 27, 2009. He stated that while most suicide notes focus on themes of remorse and the person not being able to go on with life, the note supposedly written by Ashley was focused on taking the blame off of Castor. He said that this theme was repeated fourteen times within the note and that he believes Castor will never admit to guilt of the murders. The code of murderers such as these, he said, is "deny, deny, deny" until the bitter end. When asked if Castor's behavior and body language on the stand shows any sort of clue about her mental state and guilt, Knoll reminded that body language and behavior can be affected by events during a trial (such as "side effects of medications, anxiety, fatigue and attorney instructions to the defendant on how to behave") and that their interpretation is not always reliable.

Though Castor was not officially defined as a serial killer, it is likely that she would have killed again. Knoll said that killers may have many different motivations. He described Castor as a "black widow" type rather than a typical serial killer. He described a "black widow" type as a woman who kills husbands or lovers for material gain, as opposed to the typical serial killer (men who kill consecutively for sexual or sadistic motives). He relayed that "psychopathic traits and histories of childhood abuse have been consistently reported in these women" and suggested that if Castor were guilty of the crimes of which she had been convicted and accused, then she would be demonstrating psychopathic traits, including regarding even her own child as an object to be used for her convenience.

Forensic Files  had an episode titled "Freeze Framed" regarding Castor. In addition to the Turner and Castor antifreeze murder cases, similar cases were reported in 2008. In 2002, a man had been convicted of murdering his wife by antifreeze in 1998. A letter she had written before her death incriminated him as the murderer if she were to die eventually; the letter led to his prosecution.  Series Sex Lies and Murder, series 2 episode 3 as well as describing the events leading to the trial included an interview with the district attorney in the case. The DA pointed out Castor may have murdered her own father, Jerry Daniels, who died February 22, 2002, shortly after his daughter visited him in the hospital where he had a minor lung complaint. Castor's first husband's family believes Castor may have killed her father having brought an open can of soda in for her father to drink in the hospital. She was the executor of his estate.

Death
Castor was found dead in her cell on the morning of June 11, 2016. It was not immediately apparent how she died and the manner of her death was listed as undetermined. It was later determined by the D.A.'s office that Castor died of a heart attack, with no evidence of suicide or foul play.

Television film
Stacey Castor's story was adapted into the Lifetime film, Poisoned Love: The Stacey Castor Story, as part of its "Ripped from the Headlines" feature-film series; this made-for-television film was first transmitted on February 1, 2020. The film starred Nia Vardalos as Castor.

References

External links
Tragic End for 'Black Widow's' First Love - Official ABC 20/20 YouTube clip
Did 'Black Widow' Kill Two Husbands? - Official ABC 20/20 YouTube clip
Daughter testifies in Stacey Castor murder trial (Video)
Update: Jurors talk on video about Stacey Castor guilty verdict

1967 births
2016 deaths
21st-century American criminals
Poisoners
American female murderers
American female criminals
American prisoners sentenced to life imprisonment
Prisoners sentenced to life imprisonment by New York (state)
American people convicted of murder
People convicted of forgery
People convicted of murder by New York (state)
People from Clay, New York
People from Bedford Hills, New York
Prisoners who died in New York (state) detention
Murderers for life insurance money
Mariticides
American people convicted of attempted murder
20th-century American criminals
Criminals from New York (state)